The Wuqiangxi Dam is a gravity dam on the Yuan River in Yuanling County, Hunan Province, China. The purpose of the dam is flood control, hydroelectric power generation and navigation. The dam supports a 1,200 MW power station (255 MW firm power) along with a three-stage ship lock. Initial construction on the dam began in September 1986 and construction on the dam's structures began in December 1989. All five generators were operational in December 1996.

See also 

 List of power stations in China

References

Yuanling County
Hydroelectric power stations in Hunan
Dams in China
Gravity dams
Dams completed in 1996
Locks of China
Energy infrastructure completed in 1996
1996 establishments in China